The following is a list of bands and musicians from the North East and Yorkshire of England, by town or city. Those to have a number one single are shown in bold.

Bands and musicians

Barnsley
Danse Society
Exit Calm
Party Day
Hands Off Gretel
Kate Rusby
Saxon
The Bar-Steward Sons of Val Doonican

Batley
Robert Palmer

Benton
Jimmy Nail

Bingley
Marmozets

Bolton upon Dearne
The Sherlocks

Bradford

Anti System
Tasmin Archer
The Cult
Kiki Dee
Susan Fassbender
Fun-Da-Mental
Gareth Gates
Allan Holdsworth
Natalia Kills
Zayn Malik
Chantel McGregor
Melissa Steel
My Dying Bride
New Model Army
Smokie
Southern Death Cult
Terrorvision
Kimberley Walsh (from Girls Aloud)

Bridlington
Ben Parcell

Brighouse
Brighouse and Rastrick Brass Band (attained No. 2 position in the charts, the highest ever for a brass band) 
Embrace

Consett
Ruth Copeland, soul and blues singer
Susan Maughan

Darlington
Vic Reeves (as in Vic Reeves and Bob Mortimer - see Middlesbrough)
We Start Fires

Dewsbury
Bob Hardy (bassist from Franz Ferdinand)
Joel Graham (bassist from Evile)

Doncaster
Tony Christie
Groop Dogdrill
Tiny Dancers (from South Elmsall)
Louis Tomlinson
The Wallbirds
Yungblud

Durham
 Gem Archer (guitarist with Oasis)
 Martha (from Pity Me)
 Prefab Sprout (from Witton Gilbert)
 Voorhees
 Trevor Horn (of The Buggles)

Halifax
Nick Holmes
Don Lang
Paradise Lost
Ed Sheeran
Richard Bedford
The Orielles

Harrogate
Acid Reign
Blood Youth
Stuart Colman
Fig.4.0
The Harrogate Band
Garry Jennings
Little Angels
Daniel Schwarz. Daniel and Otto Schwarz were travelling bandleaders who performed mainly in Harrogate.
Otto Schwarz.
Sulk
Utah Saints
Wally
Mark Wharton
Workshed

Helmsley
One Night Only

Huddersfield
Evile
Kava Kava
O'Hooley & Tidow
John McCoy (bassist with Gillan, McCoy & G.M.T.)
Sore Throat

Keighley
Skeletal Family

Kingston upon Hull

The Beautiful South
Biscuit Boy (a.k.a. Crackerman) (Paul Heaton's solo act)
The Cutler
Everything but the Girl
Fila Brazillia
Fonda 500
Roland Gift (from Fine Young Cannibals)
The Heights of Abraham
Hey, Rube!
Ronnie Hilton (following his demobilisation in 1947, he took work as a fitter in Leeds)
Homespun (band formed by Dave Rotheray, formerly of The Beautiful South)
The Housemartins
J*S*T*A*R*S
Kingmaker
Nyam Nyam
The Paddingtons
The Rats
Red Guitars
Mick Ronson (best known for work with David Bowie – see Tadcaster)
Sade (formed in London but three of the five members were Hull natives)
Salako
Salem
Scarlet
Throbbing Gristle
Trevor Bolder (David Bowie's Spiders From Mars with Mick Ronson, Uriah Heep, Wishbone Ash)
Lal Waterson
Norma Waterson
The Watersons
Infant Annihilator

Leeds

Mark Abrahams
Abrasive Wheels
Age of Chance
Alt-J
Big Cheese
Black Wire 
Castrovalva
Michael Chapman
The Chevin
Christie
Chumbawamba
Classically Handsome Brutes
Sean Conlon (member of Five)
Cryptic Shift
Cud
Dead Disco
Eagulls
Embrace
Eureka Machines
The Expelled
The Flex
¡Forward, Russia!
Gang of Four
Gentleman's Dub Club
Girls at Our Best!
Higher Power
Hood
I Like Trains
Kaiser Chiefs
The Lodger
The March Violets
The Mekons
Mel B (solo and also of the Spice Girls)
The Mission
The Music
The Pigeon Detectives
Pulled Apart by Horses
Corrine Bailey Rae
Jason Rae (born in Aberdeen; lived in Leeds)
Red Lorry Yellow Lorry
Lou Rhodes
Roller Trio
Paul Ryan
Scritti Politti
Send More Paramedics
Sigma
The Sisters of Mercy
Soft Cell
Static Dress
The Sunshine Underground
Utah Saints
The Wedding Present
Your Vegas
Tom Zanetti

Middlesbrough

Amelia Lily
James Arthur
Black Wire
Roy Chubby Brown
Cattle and Cane
The Chapman Family
Collectors Club
Chris Corner (also frontman of Hartlepool-based band Sneaker Pimps)
David Coverdale (from nearby Saltburn, lead singer with Whitesnake)
Vin Garbutt
The Hangmen
IAMX
Journey South
Maxïmo Park
Misery Addict
Bob Mortimer (as in Vic Reeves and Bob Mortimer- see Darlington)
Chris Rea
Paul Rodgers (of Free and Bad Company)
Space Raiders
Jamie Tinkler (Eurovision, Pop Idol and X Factor contestant; member of boy/girl band POP!; two top twenty singles)
Whitesnake

Newcastle

The Animals
Sam Fender from North Shields
Cheryl Cole (of Girls Aloud)
Dire Straits
Drill
Dubstar
Geordie
Hurrah!
Jack the Lad
Jade Thirlwall born at nearby South Shields
Lee Jackson (of The Nice, Jackson Heights, and Refugee)
Brian Johnson (of AC/DC and Geordie)
Lighthouse Family
Lindisfarne
Maxïmo Park
Danny McCormack (from 3 Colours Red)
Peace Burial at Sea
Perrie Edwards born at nearby South Shields
Raven
Spike
Sting
Andy Taylor (of Duran Duran; from nearby Cullercoats)
Neil Tennant (of the Pet Shop Boys; born at nearby North Shields, schooled in Newcastle)
Venom 
Bruce Welch and Hank Marvin (of The Shadows)
The Wildhearts
Kathryn Williams (originally from Liverpool; based in Newcastle after attending university there)
Zoviet France
yfriday

Ossett
Black Lace (featured on a local film, the Bradford-set Rita, Sue and Bob Too)

Ovingham
China Drum

Rotherham
Nick Banks (from Sheffield band Pulp)
Bring Me the Horizon (Drummer Matthew Nichols is from Rotherham.)
Jo Callis
Jive Bunny and the Mastermixers
Muse (Although actually formed in Teignmouth, Devon, bassist Chris Wolstenholme is from Rotherham.)

Rothwell
The Pigeon Detectives

Ryton
The Unthanks

Scarborough
Little Angels
The Friday Club

Settle
John Newman

Sheffield

ABC
Arctic Monkeys
Derek Bailey
Dave Berry
Black Spiders
Bring Me the Horizon
Bromheads Jacket
Cabaret Voltaire
Paul Carrack
Chakk
Clock DVA
Jarvis Cocker
Joe Cocker
Comsat Angels 
Dead Sons
Def Leppard
The Dylans
Richard Hawley
Heaven 17
The Heights of Abraham
Hey, Rube!
The Human League
J*S*T*A*R*S
Little Glitches
Little Man Tate
The Long Blondes
Longpigs
Paul Shaft
Lucy Spraggan
Malevolence
Milburn
Moloko
Monkey Swallows the Universe
Pulp
Reverend and the Makers
Rolo Tomassi
Stoney
Thompson Twins
While She Sleeps

Stakeford
Darren Allison (drummer/producer with The Divine Comedy; also worked with My Bloody Valentine, Belle and Sebastian, and Spiritualized)

Sunderland
Mark Brydon (of Moloko)
Field Music
Bob Fox
The Futureheads
The Golden Virgins
The J.T.A
Kane Gang
Alex Kapranos (raised in Sunderland and South Shields)
Kenickie
Leatherface
Olive
Dave Stewart (of the Eurythmics)
The Toy Dolls
Wodensthrone
Frankie & the Heartstrings
Don Airey ( Key boards for various, presently Deep Purple )
Emeli Sandé
A Tribe of Toffs

Lancashire
Fivepenny Piece

Todmorden
Keith Emerson
John Helliwell (Supertramp)
Geoff Love
Working Men's Club

Tynemouth
The Motorettes

Wakefield
Be-Bop Deluxe
The Cribs
Fiat Lux
The Research 
Vardis
Jane McDonald

Washington
Bryan Ferry (of Roxy Music)
Yourcodenameis:milo

Whitby
Arthur Brown (of The Crazy World of Arthur Brown)

Whitley Bay
Tygers of Pan Tang
L Devine

York
Asking Alexandria
John Barry
The Batfish Boys
Berri (singer)
Cyanide
Glamour of the Kill
Chris Helme
Elliot Minor
Mostly Autumn
The Mood
The Redskins
RSJ
The Seahorses
Shed Seven
The Smoke
Supermoon
Van Der Neer

Notable albums

Live at Leeds
Released in 1970, Live at Leeds is the most famous live album performed by The Who. The album was recorded from a concert held at the University of Leeds as part of a two leg gig. The preferred recording was from the second night at Hull, however the bass line failed to record so the Leeds recording was used instead. It is thought by many to be the best live rock album of all time and is included in the book 1001 Albums You Must Hear Before You Die. The album made it to No. 3 in the UK charts and No. 4 in the US charts.

Live at Leeds
Live at Leeds is a John Martyn album. He independently released this album himself in an initial run of 10,000. Recorded 13 February 1975 (the sleeve incorrectly states October), at Leeds University, this is an essential snapshot of Martyn at what is possibly his peak.

London 0, Hull 4
The Housemartins' debut album, London 0 Hull 4, released in 1986, refers to the band's home town in the form of a sports result. The title may have been a jibe at London centrism, and Whitehall itself; given that the band were known Marxists, this wouldn't have been out of context. The album made it to No. 3 in the UK charts.

Fog on the Tyne
Lindisfarne's 1971 album Fog on the Tyne was named after Newcastle's river, the Tyne and the morning fog cover which it is widely associated. The highly acclaimed album made No. 1 in the UK album charts.

Five Bridges
The Nice's 1970 album Five Bridges was named for the classical-jazz-rock piece "The Five Bridges Suite" which occupied the first side of the LP. It was written about the UK city of Newcastle and its then five bridges on the River Tyne.

Festivals

Beverley
 Beverley Folk Festival

Bradford
 Bingley Music Live Festival
 Infest, University of Bradford (electronic and dance festival)

Dalby, North Yorkshire (near Scarborough)
Forest Tour

Kingston upon Hull
Hull Freedom Festival

Leeds

 Damnation Festival
 Leeds Festival
 O2 Wireless Festival
 Party in the Park
 Slam Dunk Festival
 V Festival

Newcastle/Gateshead
Orange Evolution Festival, various including the Quayside

Reeth (Swaledale, North Yorkshire)
Swaledale Festival (choral, folk, brass music, etc.)

Scarborough, North Yorkshire

Beached Festival

Sheffield
Give It A Name
Tramlines

Wakefield
 Clarence Park Festival 1991–Present

Whitby
Whitby Goth Weekend

Venues
Since the completion of the Leeds Arena (capacity 13,500) in May 2013 there are now three large, purpose-built arenas in the region, the other two being Newcastle (11,000) and Sheffield (13,500). The KC Stadium in Hull is used as a concert venue having hosted REM and The Who. Elland Road in Leeds is also used as one having hosted U2, Queen, Happy Mondays and the Kaiser Chiefs.

Bradford
1 in 12 Club
St George's Hall
University of Bradford

Bridlington
The Spa

Gateshead

The Sage

Halifax
Victoria Theatre
The Piece Hall

Harrogate
Harrogate International Centre

Kingston upon Hull

Craven Park
Hull Arena
Hull City Hall
Hull Venue
KCOM Stadium
University of Hull

Leeds

Bramham Park (hosts Leeds Festival)
Brudenell Social Club
The Cockpit
Elland Road (Leeds United football ground in Beeston)
F Club
Harewood House (formerly hosted O2 Wireless Festival, also hosted a few concerts)
Josephs Well
The Key Club
Leeds Arena (First Direct Arena for sponsorship purposes)
Leeds Beckett University (Leeds city centre campus)
Leeds Beckett University (Becket Park campus)
Leeds Town Hall
Le Phonographique
O2 Academy Leeds (opened as the Carling Academy, formerly Leeds Academy)
Roundhay Park (formerly held Party in the Park, also hosted Madonna and Robbie Williams)
Temple Newsham (formerly hosted Leeds Festival and V Festival, has since hosted Party in the Park)
University of Leeds (venue where The Who's Live at Leeds was recorded)

Middlesbrough
Middlesbrough Town Hall

Newcastle

Northumbria University
University of Newcastle
Utilita Arena Newcastle

Scarborough
Scarborough Open Air Theatre

Sheffield
 The Leadmill

Stockton-on-Tees
The ARC 
Georgian Theatre

Sunderland
Sunderland Empire
Stadium of Light

See also
New Yorkshire

References

Yorkshire
Yorkshire-related lists